Gori TV Broadcasting Tower (goris teleandza) is a free-standing tower structure used for communications purposes. The tower is located in Gori, Georgia  and was built in 1972. It is operated by "Telecenter of Georgia", that was established 1955. Communication systems on the tower include regular broadcast, MMDS, pager and cellular, and commercial TV. The tower is 180 m.

See also
List of towers
List of masts
List of skyscrapers

Towers completed in 1972
Communications in Georgia (country)
Towers built in the Soviet Union
Communication towers in Georgia (country)
Buildings and structures in Shida Kartli
1972 establishments in Georgia (country)